Andrea Benítez (born 10 May 1986) is a retired Argentine tennis player.

She won 11 singles and 26 doubles titles on the ITF Circuit in her career. Her best WTA singles ranking is 251, which she reached on 15 May 2006. Her career-high in doubles is 269, achieved on 22 October 2007.

Benítez made her WTA Tour main-draw debut at the 2006 Copa Colsanitas after coming through the qualifying rounds, in the doubles event partnering Betina Jozami.

ITF Circuit finals

Singles: 20 (11 titles, 9 runner-ups)

Doubles: 45 (26 titles, 19 runner-ups)

Notes

References

External links
 
 

1986 births
Living people
Argentine female tennis players
People from Formosa, Argentina
Tennis players from Buenos Aires
21st-century Argentine women